Byman is a surname. Notable people with the surname include:

Bob Byman (born 1955), American golfer
Daniel Byman, American political scientist
Isabelle Yalkovsky Byman (1906–1981), American pianist and music educator
Lennart Byman (1875–1947), Finnish Lutheran clergyman and politician
Reijo Byman (born 1955), Finnish hurdler